Christopher John Koch AO (16 July 1932 – 23 September 2013) was an Australian novelist, known for his 1978 novel The Year of Living Dangerously, which was adapted into an award-winning film. He twice won the Miles Franklin Award (for The Doubleman in 1985, and for Highways to a War in 1996). In 1995, he was made an Officer of the Order of Australia for his contribution to Australian literature, and was awarded an honorary Doctor of Letters from his alma mater, the University of Tasmania, in 1990.

Early life and education
Koch was born in Hobart, Tasmania, in 1932. He was educated at Clemes College, St Virgil's College, Hobart High School and at the University of Tasmania. After graduating with a Bachelor of Arts with Honours in 1954, he joined the Australian Broadcasting Commission (ABC) as a cadet journalist. He left Hobart to travel in south Asia and Europe, and ended up in London where he worked for several years. He returned to Australia to avoid national service in the British Army.

Career
While working in London as a waiter and a teacher, Koch began working on his first novel, The Boys in the Island, which he left with his agent when he returned to Australia.

Koch's first published works were several poems published in The Bulletin and the literary journal Southerly. While back at the ABC as a radio producer, The Boys in the Island was published in the UK. The positive reviews encouraged Koch to eventually take up writing full-time in 1972. In the early 1960s, Koch was awarded a writing fellowship to Stanford University, where he taught literature and was associated with Ken Kesey (author of One Flew Over the Cuckoo's Nest).

His novel The Year of Living Dangerously, set in Jakarta during the fall of the Sukarno regime, was made into a film directed by Peter Weir and starring Sigourney Weaver, Mel Gibson and Linda Hunt. The book was loosely inspired by his brother's (Philip Koch) experience as an Australian journalist in Indonesia during that period. Koch himself had worked for two months in Jakarta in 1968 as an adviser to UNESCO.

Death
Koch died at his home in Hobart on 23 September 2013, aged 81. He had been diagnosed with cancer twelve months earlier.

Personal life
Koch married his first wife, Irene Vilnois, in 1959. Their son, Gareth Koch (born 1962), is a classical guitarist. He married his second wife, Robin Whyte-Butler, in the late 1990s, and she lived with him in Sydney and Tasmania, and was with him when he died in 2013.

Awards and honours

Published works
 The Boys in the Island (1958, revised ed, Angus & Robertson, 1974)
 Across the Sea Wall (Heinemann, 1965)
 The Year of Living Dangerously (Nelson, 1978)
 The Doubleman (Chatto and Windus, 1985)
 Crossing the Gap: a novelist's essays (Hogarth Press, 1993)
 Highways to a War (Heinemann, 1995)
 Out of Ireland (Doubleday, 1999)
 The Many-Coloured Land: A Return to Ireland (Picador, 2002)
 The Memory Room (2007)
 Lost Voices (2012)

Further reading
 Noel Henricksen, Island and Otherland: Christopher Koch and his books (Educare, 2003).

References

External links

Christopher Koch at Random House Australia

1932 births
2013 deaths
Writers from Tasmania
Miles Franklin Award winners
Officers of the Order of Australia
Recipients of the Order of the Cross of Terra Mariana, 5th Class
Australian people of English descent
Australian people of German descent
University of Tasmania alumni
People from Hobart
20th-century Australian novelists
21st-century Australian novelists
Deaths from cancer in Tasmania
Articles containing video clips
Australian male novelists